George Powell (12 April 1918 – 11 April 1994) was an Australian cricketer. He played four first-class matches for New South Wales between 1941/42 and 1948/49.

See also
 List of New South Wales representative cricketers

References

External links
 

1918 births
1994 deaths
Australian cricketers
New South Wales cricketers
Cricketers from Sydney